Chicago World's Fair may refer to:

World's Columbian Exposition of 1893
Century of Progress Exposition of 1933